Forestville Commonwealth is an archaeological site and national historic district located at Earlton in Greene County, New York. The district contains seven contributing sites.  It represents the remains of a utopian community built in 1826-1827 as one of three Owenite experiments in New York State.

It was listed on the National Register of Historic Places in 1974.

References

Historic districts on the National Register of Historic Places in New York (state)
Archaeological sites on the National Register of Historic Places in New York (state)
Historic districts in Greene County, New York
Utopian communities in the United States
National Register of Historic Places in Greene County, New York
Owenism